Alfredo Jesus da Silva is a Portuguese former footballer who played as a defender.

Career  
Alfredo played in the Segunda Divisão in 1968 with Boavista F.C. The following season he played in the Primeira Divisão where he made 16 appearances. In the summer of 1970 he played abroad in the National Soccer League with Toronto First Portuguese. In his debut season with Toronto he assisted in securing the NSL Cup against Toronto Hellas.

References  

Living people
Association football defenders
Portuguese footballers
Boavista F.C. players
Toronto First Portuguese players
Primeira Liga players
Segunda Divisão players
Canadian National Soccer League players
Portuguese expatriate footballers
Expatriate soccer players in Canada
Portuguese expatriate sportspeople in Canada
Year of birth missing (living people)